Odetta at the Best of Harlem is a live album by Odetta, released in 1976. It was recorded live at the club The Best of Harlem in Stockholm, Sweden.

It was her last release until 1987.

Track listing
"Hit or Miss"
"Kukaboro"
"Go in and Out Your Window"
"Water Is Wide (Waly Waly)"
"Gift of Heaven"
"Sail Away Ladies"
"Roll On Buddy"
"Lowlands"
"Deep Blue Sea"
"Michael Row the Boat"
"Cool Water" (Bob Nolan)
"Until It's Time for You to Go"
"It's Impossible"

Personnel
Odetta – vocals, guitar
Red Mitchell – bass on "It's Impossible"
Christopher Joseph – piano on "It's Impossible"

Odetta live albums
1976 live albums